Devor is a surname. Notable people with the surname include: 

Aaron Devor (born 1951), Canadian sociologist and sexologist
Anna Devor (born 1972), Israeli-American biomedical engineer
Richard E. DeVor (1944–2011), American engineer and academic
Robinson Devor, American film director and screenwriter